In biology, mimesis (from ancient Greek μίμησις mímēsis, "imitation") refers to a form of crypsis where living creatures mimic the form, colour and posture of their surroundings to avoid being noticed from their surroundings by predators depending on sight. Mimesis is a form of crypsis and thus differs from mimicry, which is a form of aposematism. In English mimesis is often counted as a form of mimicry.

Mimesis can be divided by the type of objects being mimicked:
 Zoomimesis refers to mimicry of different animals. Contrary to mimicry, in zoomimesis the model animal is neither poisonous or capable of putting up a fight. Examples include various visitor species of ants (myrmecophily), resembling the ants in whose nests they live.
 Phytomimesis refers to mimicry of plants or parts of plants. Some geometer moths resemble thin twigs in appearance. Stick insects have a body shape resembling twigs or leaves (as in walking leaves). Notodontidae moths resemble the bark of deciduous trees. Some species in this family, such as the alder kitten and the sallow kitten have cocoons resembling tree bark. Some potoo birds resemble broken branches.
 Allomimesis refers to mimicry of lifeless objects. Some small butterflies resemble bird droppings. Some species of fig-marigolds living in African deserts resemble stones and are thus known as "living stones".

This type of mimicry developed already 50 million years ago in micromoths, whose quivers in their larval stage resembled the forest soil. Evidence of this has been preserved in Baltic amber.

References

Mimicry
Animal communication